Lee Gentil (born 18 December 1925) is a sailor from Puerto Rico, who represented his country at the 1968 Summer Olympics in Acapulco, Mexico, the 1972 Summer Olympics in Kiel, Germany and the 1976 Summer Olympics in Kingston, Ontario, Canada as crew member in the Soling. With helmsman Juan R. Torruella and fellow crew member James Fairbank, they took the 22nd place.

Sources
 

Living people
1934 births
Sailors at the 1968 Summer Olympics – 5.5 Metre
Sailors at the 1972 Summer Olympics – Finn
Sailors at the 1976 Summer Olympics – Soling
Olympic sailors of Puerto Rico
Puerto Rican male sailors (sport)
20th-century Puerto Rican people